Although Japanese gymnasts competed at numerous Olympic Games as early as 1932, they didn't compete at the World Artistic Gymnastics Championships until 1954.  The men's team immediately achieved success, winning silver in the team event and individually Masao Takemoto won gold on floor exercise. The women's team won their first team medal, a bronze, in 1962.

Medalists

Medal tables

By gender

By event

Junior World medalists

References 

World Artistic Gymnastics Championships
Gymnastics in Japan